USS Frederick (LST-1184) was a  which replaced the traditional bow door-design tank landing ships (LSTs) of the United States Navy. The ship was named after the city of Frederick, Maryland and Frederick County, Maryland. The vessel entered service in 1970 with the United States Pacific Fleet and saw service during the Vietnam War, and the Persian Gulf War earning three battle stars. The ship was decommissioned in 2002 and put up for sale.

Frederick was acquired by the Mexican Navy the same year as part of the Security Assistance Program and entered service in December 2002 renamed ARM Usumacinta. Usumacinta has since taken part in three RIMPAC multi-national naval exercises as well as provide humanitarian support following earthquakes in Oaxaca and Chiapas.

Design and description
However, the traditional bow door form for LSTs would not be capable. Therefore, the designers of the Newport class came up with a design of a traditional ship hull with a  aluminum ramp slung over the bow supported by two derrick arms. This made the Newport class the first to depart from the standard LST design that had been developed in early World War II.

Frederick was fitted with six Alco 251-C diesel engines turning two shafts, three to each shaft. The ship was also equipped with a bow thruster to allow for better maneuvering near causeways and to hold position while offshore during the unloading of amphibious vehicles.

The Newport class were larger and faster than previous LSTs and were able to transport tanks, heavy vehicles and engineer groups and supplies that were too large for helicopters or smaller landing craft to carry. The LSTs have a ramp forward of the superstructure that connects the lower tank deck with the main deck and a passage large enough to allow access to the parking area amidships. The vessels are also equipped with a stern gate to allow the unloading of amphibious vehicles directly into the water or to unload onto a utility landing craft (LCU) or pier. At either end of the tank deck there is a  turntable that permits vehicles to turn around without having to reverse. The vessels also have davits for four vehicle and personnel landing craft (LCVPs) and could carry four pontoon causeway sections along the sides of the hull.

Frederick was initially armed with four Mark 33 /50 caliber guns in two twin turrets. The vessel was equipped with two Mk 63 gun control fire systems (GCFS) for the 3-inch guns, but these were removed in 1977–1978. The ship also had SPS-10 surface search radar. Atop the stern gate, the vessels mounted a helicopter deck. They had a maximum complement of 213 including 11 officers.

Construction and career

United States Navy service
The ship was ordered as part of a group of eight ships in Fiscal Year 1966. The LST was laid down on 13 April 1968 at San Diego, California, by the National Steel and Shipbuilding Company. Named for a city of city and county in Maryland, the vessel was launched on 8 March 1969, sponsored by Mrs. Kleber S. Masterson. Frederick was commissioned into the United States Navy on 11 April 1970.

Following shakedown, Frederick was assigned to the Amphibious Force, Pacific Fleet, and was homeported at San Diego. She made over thirteen major deployments to the Western Pacific and Far East. Frederick earned one award of the Meritorious Unit Commendation and three battle stars for Vietnam service. Frederick was decommissioned on 5 October 2002.

Mexican Navy service
 
Frederick was sold to Mexico as part of the Security Assistance Program on 9 December 2002 and was commissioned into the Mexican Navy as ARM Usumacinta (A 412) the same day. The ship was struck from the United States Naval Vessel Register on 6 November 2002.

In 2012 ARM Usumacinta, along with a Naval Infantry detachment, took part in the large multi-national naval exercise RIMPAC 2012 off the coast of the Hawaiian Islands. The ship also took part in RIMPAC 2016 and RIMPAC 2018. In 2017, following earthquakes in Oaxaca and Chiapas, the ship was used to transport  of supplies to the stricken areas.

Citations

Sources

External links

 navsource.org: USS Frederick
 united-states-navy.com: USS Frederick

Newport-class tank landing ships
Ships built in San Diego
1969 ships
Cold War amphibious warfare vessels of the United States
Vietnam War amphibious warfare vessels of the United States
Newport-class tank landing ships of the Mexican Navy
Amphibious warfare vessels of Mexico